The Black Sea salmon (Salmo labrax) is a fairly small species of salmon, at about  long on average and rarely reaching over . It inhabits the northern Black Sea coasts and inflowing rivers. There are anadromous, lacustrine and resident river populations. This fish is a close relative of the brown trout. While it is the only native species of Salmo present in the northern Black Sea basin, it may hybridize with (introduced) brown trout in the major rivers. Sea-run populations are currently at low numbers, but the resident river stocks are doing well.

References

Salmo
Fish described in 1814
Commercial fish
Fish of Europe
Fish of the Black Sea